Heart & Lung is a bimonthly peer-reviewed nursing journal covering research on the care of patients with cardiac and pulmonary disorders. It is published by Mosby on behalf of the American Association of Heart Failure Nurses. The journal was established in 1995, with Kathleen S. Stone as its founding editor-in-chief. Its current editor-in-chief is Nancy S. Redeker (Yale University).

The journal is abstracted and indexed in CINAHL, MEDLINE, and PubMed. According to the Journal Citation Reports, the journal has a 2017 impact factor of 1.730.

References

External links

Cardiac nursing journals
Pulmonology journals
Publications established in 1995
Mosby academic journals
Bimonthly journals
English-language journals